Netball is a sport available to girls in physical education classes in Brunei.

The national team competed in its first ever international tournament the 2012 Asian Netball Championships.

See also
 Sport in Brunei

References

Additional sources
 Brunei Netball For Singapore Exposure
 Angel Net 'A' Netball Champion

Bibliography

External links
 Olympic Council of Asia